Paraclinus tanygnathus, the Longjaw blenny, is a species of labrisomid blenny native to the Pacific coast of Mexico including the Gulf of California where it can be found at depths of from very shallow waters to about .

References

tanygnathus
Fish described in 1969
Fish of Mexican Pacific coast